Born Niharika Bhasin  is an Indian costume designer who works in Hindi cinema (Bollywood), and is most known for her work in Rock On!! (2008) and  The Dirty Picture (2011), for which she won the National Film Award for Best Costume Design as well as Filmfare Award for Best Costume Design.

Early life and education
Born to a Punjabi father and Parsi mother. She did her bachelor's degree in public relations and HR from Seattle, US.

Career
Bhasin started her career with Khoya Khoya Chand (2007). She got noticed with rocker film Rock On!! (2008), and got her big banner break with Yash Raj Films's Band Baaja Baaraat (2010).

Filmography

 Khoya Khoya Chand (2007)
 Rock On!! (2008)
 Bhoothnath (2008)
 Rocket Singh: Salesman of the Year (2009)
 Karthik Calling Karthik (2010)
 Band Baaja Baaraat (2010)
 Delhi Belly (2011)
 Trishna  (2011)
 The Dirty Picture (2011)
 F.A.L.T.U (2011)
 Ajab Gazabb Love (2012)
 Rowdy Rathore (2012)
 Heroine (2012)
 Inkaar (2013)
 Kai Po Che! (2013)
 Chashme Baddoor (2013)
 The Lunch Box (2013)
 Tigers (2014)
 Roy (2015)
 Bombay Velvet (2015)
 Ungli (2014)
 Rang Rasiya (2014)
 Margarita with a Straw (2014)
 Fitoor (2016)
 Fan (2016)
 Mirzya (2016) 
 Shivaay (2016)
 Petta (2019)
 De De Pyaar De (2019)
 Pati Patni aur Woh (2019)
 Darbar (2020)
 Shakuntala Devi (2019)

Awards

Personal life
Her brother Arjun Bhasin is also a costume designer, known for Dil Chahta Hai (2001), Rang De Basanti (2006) and Zindagi Na Milegi Dobara (2011). She was married to film and television actor Ayub Khan, who is known for TV series, Uttaran (2008). Her husband is the nephew of yesteryear film stars Dilip Kumar and Saira Bano.

References

External links
 

Living people
Indian costume designers
Filmfare Awards winners
Fashion stylists
Artists from Mumbai
21st-century Indian designers
Women artists from Maharashtra
21st-century Indian women artists
Best Costume Design National Film Award winners
1969 births